Antholz-Mittertal is a frazione of the municipality of Rasen-Antholz in South Tyrol in Italy. It is right on the border of Italy and Austria.

Sources
 Map of Antholz-Mittertal 
 Webpage 

Frazioni of South Tyrol